is a Japanese manga artist, illustrator and dōjin artist from Hyōgo Prefecture. She officially romanizes her name as aokiume.

Aoki provided the voice for her Metapod persona in the Shaft anime adaptation of her four-panel comic strip Hidamari Sketch. She later created the original character designs for Puella Magi Madoka Magica, a Shaft anime production.

Works
Hidamari Sketch (2004–present; original manga published in Manga Time Kirara Carat) – Voice of 'Ume-sensei' in anime adaptation
Sanarara (2005) – Character design, artwork
 (2006–present; original manga published in Dragon Age Pure)
Puella Magi Madoka Magica (2011–present) – Original character design
 (2012–present; original manga published in Manga Time Kirara Carino)
 (2014–present; manga published in  Hakusensha's Rakuen (Le Paradis))
Magia Record: Puella Magi Madoka Magica Side Story (2017–present) – Original character design

References

External links
 Ume Aoki's personal website 
 
 

Manga artists from Hyōgo Prefecture
Women manga artists
Japanese illustrators
Japanese women illustrators
Japanese voice actresses
Living people
Japanese female comics artists
Female comics writers
21st-century Japanese women writers
1981 births